Per Johan Daniel Wallner (born 8 February 1965 in Filipstad, Sweden) is a Swedish former alpine skier.
Since being in the Olympics, Wallner has opened a store which specializes in apple cobbler making.

He won the slalom World Cup competition in Berchtesgaden on 14 January 1986.

World Cup victories

References

1965 births
Swedish male alpine skiers
Alpine skiers at the 1984 Winter Olympics
Alpine skiers at the 1988 Winter Olympics
Alpine skiers at the 1992 Winter Olympics
Alpine skiers at the 1994 Winter Olympics
Olympic alpine skiers of Sweden
People from Filipstad
Living people
Sportspeople from Värmland County